Jeff Richards (November 1, 1924 – July 28, 1989) was an American minor league baseball player with the Portland Beavers, who later became an actor. He was sometimes credited as Dick Taylor and Richard Taylor.

He is best known for his role as Benjamin Pontipee in Seven Brides for Seven Brothers (1954). Following this performance, he tied with George Nader and Joe Adams for the Golden Globe for Most Promising Newcomer. Despite this, his acting career soon foundered.

Early life and career

He was born Richard Mansfield Taylor in Portland, Oregon. Taylor joined the United States Navy during World War II and served until 1946. After, he played shortstop for the Portland Beavers for a year and then for the Salem Senators; however, his baseball career ended after he tore a ligament and was unable to play anymore.

Early Acting Career
He then went to Hollywood to pursue a film career. His first roles included uncredited bits at Warner Bros in The Big Punch (1948), Johnny Belinda (1948), Fighter Squadron (1948) and The Girl from Jones Beach (1949).

At 20th Century Fox, he had small roles in Mother Is a Freshman (1949), and Cheaper by the Dozen (1950). He went to Columbia to make Kill the Umpire (1950), cast as "Richard Taylor". He played a baseball player and publicity said he used to play for Salem in the Western League and that they had spent six weeks trying to cast the role.

MGM
He got a screen test at Metro-Goldwyn Mayer and the studio changed his name to Jeff Richards.

Richards had uncredited roles in The Strip (1951) with Mickey Rooney, The Tall Target (1951) with Dick Powell and Paula Raymond, and The People Against O'Hara (1951) with Spencer Tracy, and a bigger credited part in Angels in the Outfield (1951) as a baseball player. He was being sought to play Frank Merriwell.

Richards had small roles in Just This Once (1952) with Peter Lawford, The Sellout (1952) with Walter Pidgeon, Desperate Search (1952), The Bad and the Beautiful (1952) with Kirk Douglas, Above and Beyond (1952) with Jane Greer, and Battle Circus (1953) with Humphrey Bogart. He had a slightly bigger part in Code Two (1953) with Ralph Meeker.

Career peak
Richards had his first sizeable role, billed third as a ball player, in Big Leaguer (1954). Seagulls Over Sorrento (1954) was another decent sized role. Then Richards was the third lead in Seven Brides for Seven Brothers (1954), after Howard Keel and Jane Powell. It was a big hit and established him as a film name. MGM started to build him up as a star. Dore Schary, head of the studio, said the actor had "tremendous personal charm" and "looks like a great bet [to become a star], based on his reception til now."

MGM announced him as star of O'Kelley's Eclipse but it was not made. He was announced for Forbidden Planet but did not appear in the final film. Bar Sinister with Roger Moore was announced but not made.

Richards was one of Eleanor Parker's brothers in Many Rivers to Cross (1955) and was finally given a star part in the Western The Marauders (1955) playing a hero opposite Dan Duryea. He played the lead in the box-office flop It's a Dog's Life (1955) and had one of the male leads in the musical The Opposite Sex (1956) with June Allyson, Joan Collins, and Ann Sheridan.

The Marauders, It's a Dog's Life and The Opposite Sex all lost money and MGM began to lose enthusiasm for Richards. He began working on TV, guest starring in "Man with a Choice" for The Web (1957) and "The Other Side of the Curtain" for Suspicion.

Richards supported Glenn Ford in MGM's popular comedy Don't Go Near the Water (1957) but it was a relatively minor role. In April 1957 he secured his release from the studio.

Post MGM
Richards guest starred on The Millionaire, and Schlitz Playhouse, then co-starred with Mamie Van Doren in the Warner Bros rodeo drama Born Reckless (1958).

In 1958, on television, Richards played the title role in the NBC western television series Jefferson Drum (1958–59), the story of a crusading journalist, with Eugene Martin portraying his young son. The series was cancelled after twenty-six episodes aired over two seasons.

He also had the lead in Island of Lost Women (1959) made by Jaguar Productions. Richards signed a five-year contract with Jaguar to make two films a year but made no further films for them.

He guest-starred in Behind Closed Doors, Alcoa Theatre, Adventures in Paradise, and Laramie and played the role in 1961 of Jubal Evans in the episode "Incident of His Brother's Keeper" of the CBS western Rawhide.

Richards' last lead role was in the underwater adventure The Secret of the Purple Reef (1960). His last role was in 1966 as Kallen in the film Waco.

Personal life
Richards married Shirley Sibre in 1954, but they were divorced the following year. He married Vickie Flaxman in 1955, and they had one child (a son born in 1957) before they divorced in 1959. She later married actor Van Williams. Richards retired from acting and moved to San Bernardino County, where he lived in a trailer park and collected disability for the remainder of his life.

Jeff Richards died on July 28, 1989, aged 64 from acute respiratory failure. He is buried at Riverside National Cemetery in Riverside, California.

Filmography

References

External links

 
 

Minor league baseball players
1924 births
1989 deaths
American male film actors
American male television actors
Baseball players from Oregon
Burials at Riverside National Cemetery
New Star of the Year (Actor) Golden Globe winners
Metro-Goldwyn-Mayer contract players
Male actors from Portland, Oregon
20th-century American male actors